Attas or al-Attas or Alatas may refer to:
 Ali Alatas, former Foreign Minister of Indonesia
 Haidar Abu Bakr al-Attas, Prime Minister of Yemen 
 Syed Muhammad Naquib al-Attas, Muslim scholar
 Syed Hussein Alatas, Malaysian academician, sociologist and politician and the older brother of Syed Muhammad Naquib al-Attas
 Syed Farid al-Attas, Malaysian sociologist and the son of Syed Hussein Alatas
 Hamida al-Attas, mother of Osama bin Laden
 Jai Al-Attas, co-founder and co-owner of Australian independent label Below Par Records 
 Huda al-Attas, Yemeni journalist and author